Wahid Khan, more commonly known as Wahid Khan Beenkar or Indorewale Wahid Khan, (c. 1840s – 1933) was an Indian classical rudra veena player and, along with his younger brother Ghagge Nazir Khan, founded the Mewati gharana, later popularized by Pandit Jasraj and Rais Khan.

Background
Nazir Khan was born in the 1840s to a family of Khandarbani dhrupad musicians based in Agra. His grandfather was Dada Tikkad. He was trained in singing and rudra veena by his father, Imam Khan, and uncle, Wazir Khan, alongside his younger brother, Ghagge Nazir Khan.

Wahid Khan continued his training with Bande Ali Khan and became one of only two of his anointed disciples. Consequently, Wahid Khan is often affiliated with Bande Ali Khan's traditions, Kirana and Dagarbani, but forged his own path through the Mewati gharana, grounded in the earlier Khandarbani tradition.

Career
Wahid Khan was appointed the court musician of Jodhpur, serving under Shivajirao Holkar and Tukojirao Holkar III, succeeding his guru, Bande Ali Khan who previously held the post.

He would remain in Indore until his death in 1933. His son, Latif Khan succeeded as court musician of Indore afterwards.

Legacy
Wahid Khan was considered one of the finest rudra veena players and teachers of his time.

Disciples
Wahid Khan had six children, four of whom went on to be musicians. This includes Latif Khan, Majid Khan, Ghulam Qadir Khan, and Hamid Khan. His oldest two sons, Latif and Majid, married into the family of Imdad Khan. His great-grandson was Rais Khan, through his daughter, Begum Hasiban Bai, the mother of Mohammed Khan.

Further reading
 Rasraj by Sunita Budhiraja, Vani Prakashan, 2018.

References

External links
 Mewati Gharana website

1840s births
1933 deaths
Hindustani musicians
People from Agra
19th-century Indian Muslims
19th-century Indian male classical singers
Indian music educators
20th-century Indian male classical singers
Singers from Uttar Pradesh
Mewati gharana
Hindustani instrumentalists
Rudra veena players